Iker Guarrotxena Vallejo (born 6 December 1992) is a Spanish professional footballer who plays as an attacking midfielder for Indian Super League club Goa.

Club career 
Born in Bilbao, Biscay, Guarrotxena joined Athletic Bilbao's youth setup in 2002, aged nine. He made his senior debuts with the farm team in the 2011–12 season, in Tercera División. In the 2012 summer, he was promoted to the reserves in Segunda División B.

On 1 August 2014, Guarrotxena moved to Segunda División's CD Tenerife in a season-long loan deal. He played his first match as a professional on the 24th, starting in a 0–1 away loss against SD Ponferradina.

Guarrotxena returned to the B-side for the 2015–16 season, with the club also in the second tier. On 7 June 2016, after suffering relegation, he was released by the Lions.

On 12 July 2016, Guarrotxena signed a two-year deal with CD Mirandés, also in the second tier. Roughly one year later, after suffering relegation, he moved to fellow league team Cultural y Deportiva Leonesa.

On 4 August 2018, Guarrotxena moved to Pogoń Szczecin in the Polish Ekstraklasa, signing a three-year deal with the club.

On 2 January 2020, Greek Super League club Volos officially announced the signing of Guarrotxena on a free transfer.

On 14 January 2021, A-League club Western United official announced that Guarrotxena had signed on a one-year deal with the club.

In June 2022, Guarrotxena moved to Indian Super League, after signing with Peña who managed FC Goa. He scored his first goal for the club in a 3-0 win against Jamshedpur FC.

Personal life 
He is the nephew of retired footballer Endika, who also came through the ranks at Athletic Bilbao and won trophies with the club in the 1980s.

Career statistics

Club

Honours

Individual
 Indian Super League Hero of the Month: December 2022

References

External links 

1992 births
Living people
Spanish footballers
Footballers from Bilbao
Association football wingers
Segunda División players
Segunda División B players
Tercera División players
Ekstraklasa players
Super League Greece players
CD Basconia footballers
Bilbao Athletic footballers
CD Tenerife players
CD Mirandés footballers
Cultural Leonesa footballers
Pogoń Szczecin players
Volos N.F.C. players
Western United FC players
UD Logroñés players
Spanish expatriate footballers
Spanish expatriate sportspeople in Poland
Expatriate footballers in Poland
Expatriate footballers in Greece
Spanish expatriate sportspeople in Australia
Spanish expatriate sportspeople in Greece
Expatriate soccer players in Australia